Gateway is a 1938 American drama film directed by Alfred L. Werker and written by Lamar Trotti. The film stars Don Ameche, Arleen Whelan, Gregory Ratoff, Binnie Barnes, Gilbert Roland, Raymond Walburn and John Carradine. The film was released on August 5, 1938, by 20th Century Fox.

Plot

Cast      
Don Ameche as Dick Court
Arleen Whelan as Catherine O'Shea
Gregory Ratoff as Prince Michael Boris Alexis
Binnie Barnes as Mrs. Fay Sims
Gilbert Roland as Tony Cadona
Raymond Walburn as Mr. Benjamin McNutt
John Carradine as Leader of Refugees
Maurice Moscovitch as Grandpa Hlawek 
Harry Carey as U.S. Immigration Commissioner Nelson
Lyle Talbot as Henry Porter
Marjorie Gateson as Mrs. Arabella McNutt
Fritz Leiber as Dr. Weilander
Warren Hymer as Guard-Waiter
Eddie Conrad as Davonsky 
E. E. Clive as Room Steward
Russell Hicks as Ernest Porter
C. Montague Shaw as Captain 
Charles Coleman as Ship's Purser
Gerald Oliver Smith as an Englishman
Albert Conti as a Count
Joseph Crehan as a U.S. Immigrant Inspector
Addison Richards as a U.S. Immigrant Inspector

References

External links 
 

1938 films
20th Century Fox films
American drama films
1938 drama films
Films directed by Alfred L. Werker
American black-and-white films
Films about immigration to the United States
Films with screenplays by Lamar Trotti
1930s English-language films
1930s American films